Martin Leonard Sweeney, Sr. (April 15, 1885 – May 1, 1960), was a Democratic U.S. Representative from Ohio and the father of Robert E. Sweeney.

Biography
Born in Cleveland, Ohio, Sweeney attended parochial and public schools in the area, including St. Bridget's Parochial School. Prior to his political career, Sweeney worked as a laborer, hoisting engineer and a salesman from 1901 to 1913.  He served as a member of the State House of Representatives in 1913 and 1914 and graduated from the Cleveland Law School of Baldwin-Wallace College in 1914.  Sweeney was admitted to the bar that same year and begin practicing law in Cleveland. From 1924 to 1932 Sweeney was judge of the municipal court of Cleveland, where he vocally opposed Prohibition. Sweeney also served as a delegate to the Democratic National Convention in 1932.

From 1927 to 1931, Sweeney was national president of the Ancient Order of Hibernians.

Sweeney was elected as a Democrat to the Seventy-second Congress to fill the vacancy caused by the death of Charles A. Mooney. He was re-elected to the Seventy-third and the four succeeding Congresses, serving from November 3, 1931, to January 3, 1943. Although Sweeney initially supported President Franklin D. Roosevelt, he later turned against Roosevelt and sided with anti-Semitic priest and social justice activist Charles Coughlin. Sweeney's re-elections in 1934 and 1936 without support from the national Democratic Party led him to continue his independent congressional course in an increasing swing towards non-interventionist politics.

In September 1939, a column on The Clarksburg Exponent accused Sweeney of anti-Semitism and reported that he had opposed the appointment of foreign-born Jews to the Cleveland federal bench. Sweeney in turn later sued the paper for $250,000, a case he lost in 1941.

In the summer of 1940, a bill establishing a peacetime military draft, H.R. 10132, was introduced. Sweeney denounced the bill as an attempt to drag America into World War II on the side of Great Britain. Beverly Vincent (D-KY) said Sweeney was a traitor and a "son of a bitch." Sweeney swung at Vincent, and Vincent landed a hard right to Sweeney's head. The House doorkeeper called it the best fistfight he had witnessed in the House in his fifty years at his post.

Sweeney was an unsuccessful candidate for re-nomination in 1942 after being targeted for his stand against British Lend Lease and his alleged isolationism.  He was defeated in the primary by Michael Feighan, who represented Cleveland in Congress for the next twenty-eight years.

He was unsuccessful for the Democratic nomination for mayor of Cleveland in 1933 and in 1941, and for the gubernatorial nomination in 1944. He practiced law in Cleveland until his death there on May 1, 1960. He was interred in Calvary Cemetery.

Family
His daughter was married to the son of Cuyahoga County Sheriff Martin O'Donnell (1886–1941).

His first cousin was Dr. Francis E. Sweeney, (1894–1964) the prime suspect in the Cleveland Torso Murders (1934–1938)

References

Sources

External links 

 

1885 births
1960 deaths
20th-century American judges
Activists from Ohio
American anti-war activists
Baldwin Wallace University alumni
Burials in Calvary Cemetery (Cleveland)
Cleveland Municipal Court judges
Lawyers from Cleveland
Democratic Party members of the Ohio House of Representatives
Non-interventionism
Ohio lawyers
20th-century American politicians
20th-century American lawyers
Democratic Party members of the United States House of Representatives from Ohio
Old Right (United States)
20th-century far-right politicians in the United States